Alex Stein (born 27 October 1957) is an Israeli jurist who currently serves as a Justice on the Supreme Court of Israel and a former law professor.

Early life and education
Stein was born to a Jewish family in the Soviet Union and immigrated to Israel with his family in 1973. He completed his high school studies at the Leo Baeck Education Center in Haifa, and was drafted into the Israel Defense Forces in 1976, serving in the C4I Corps. He participated in Operation Litani and the 1982 Lebanon War. After being discharged, he studied law at the Hebrew University of Jerusalem, earning an LLB in 1983 and an LLM in 1987. He later studied at University College London and earned PhD in law from the University of London in 1990. He clerked for Rachel Sukar, head of the Criminal Litigation Department in the Attorney General's Office, from 1982 to 1983, then for Supreme Court Justice Menachem Elon from 1983 to 1984.

Legal career
Stein was admitted to the Israel Bar Association in 1984, and worked as an attorney with two law firms in Jerusalem from 1984 to 1987, specializing in commercial litigation. In his reserve military service, he served in the Military Advocate General's Office as a legal officer in the military government of the Gaza Strip.

After earning his doctorate in law in 1990, Stein joined the Faculty of Law of the Hebrew University of Jerusalem in 1991. During his tenure there, he was appointed a full Professor and served as Deputy Dean of the Faculty of Law. In 2004, he moved to New York City and joined the Faculty of the Cardozo School of Law at Yeshiva University, where he taught from 2004 to 2016. He taught at Brooklyn Law School from 2016 to 2018. He was also a visiting professor at Harvard University, Yale University, Columbia University, the University of Toronto, and the University of Oxford.

In his academic career, Stein authored four books and scores of articles, sat on the editorial boards of two law reviews, and founded an online legal journal dedicated to medical malpractice. In 2014, Stein was one of the most cited scholars in the field of evidence law in the United States.

In February 2018, Stein was selected to serve as a Justice on the Israeli Supreme Court by the Judicial Selection Committee. After returning to live in Israel, he was sworn in on 9 August 2018 upon the retirement of Justice Uri Shoham.

Stein's appointment was marred by controversy. A petition against his candidacy for the Supreme Court on grounds of his long-term residency in the United States was summarily thrown out. Reportedly, he was also questioned by the Judicial Selection Committee about his son who was living in the United States and had not served in the Israel Defense Forces, and Stein assured them that his son would do military service. It also emerged that a week before his appointment, he had deleted a Facebook account where he had criticized the Israeli Supreme Court over alleged judicial activism.

Personal life
Stein is married to Shirley Blaier-Stein, an author, an attorney and autism rights activist, and is a father of five. One of his children has special needs. He is a chess enthusiast, having been a teenage chess champion in the Soviet Union and an arbitrator in the Israeli Chess Federation.

References

1957 births
Living people
Judges of the Supreme Court of Israel
Cardozo School of Law faculty
Soviet emigrants to Israel
Soviet Jews
Brooklyn Law School faculty
Alumni of the University of London